The 41st District of the Iowa Senate is located in southeastern Iowa, and is currently composed of Davis, Jefferson, Van Buren, and Wapello Counties.

Current elected officials
Adrian Dickey is the senator currently representing the 41st District.

The area of the 41st District contains two Iowa House of Representatives districts:
The 81st District (represented by Cherielynn Westrich)
The 82nd District (represented by Jeff Shipley)

The district is also located in Iowa's 2nd congressional district, which is represented by Mariannette Miller-Meeks.

Past senators
The district has previously been represented by:

Hilarius Louis Heying, 1965–1966
Vernon H. Kyhl, 1967–1970
Earl G. Bass, 1971–1972
William E. Gluba, 1973–1976
Forrest F. Ashcraft, 1977–1978
Patrick J. Deluhery, 1979–1982
Julia Gentleman, 1983–1990
Mary Kramer, 1991–1992
Jack Hester, 1993–1994
Nancy Boettger, 1995–2002
Maggie Tinsman, 2003–2006
David Hartsuch, 2007–2010
Roby Smith, 2011–2012
Mark Chelgren, 2013–2018
Mariannette Miller-Meeks, 2019–2021
Adrian Dickey, 2021–present

See also
Iowa General Assembly
Iowa Senate

References

41